Hasseløy is an island in Haugesund municipality in Rogaland county, Norway.  The  island lies north of the island Risøy, south of the peninsula Killingøy, and between Vibrandsøy to the west and the mainland to the east. It is part of the town of Haugesund, connected to the city centre by a bridge. The informal name Bakarøy is commonly used locally.

Historically, the island was the site of industries including the shipyard Hauges Jernskibsbyggeri from 1907. Since then the island is mostly residential and several apartment buildings have replaced the old boathouses. The 2014 population is 997. The offices for the western region of the Norwegian Coastal Administration are in the southwest corner of the island. The small Dokken museum with historical boats and buildings is located on the east side, near the bridge.

The island has been connected to the mainland since 1872, the current bridge was completed in 1954.

References

Haugesund
Islands of Rogaland